Sir Robert Leicester Harmsworth, 1st Baronet (1 November 187019 January 1937) was a British businessman and Liberal politician.

Background
Harmsworth was the fourth son of Alfred Harmsworth, a barrister, and Geraldine Mary, daughter of William Maffett; and was educated at St Marylebone Grammar School. He was the brother of Alfred Harmsworth, 1st Viscount Northcliffe, Harold Harmsworth, 1st Viscount Rothermere, Cecil Harmsworth, 1st Baron Harmsworth and Sir Hildebrand Harmsworth, 1st Baronet.

Career
Harmsworth was a director of Amalgamated Press, the publishing company owned by his brother, Lord Northcliffe. In 1900 he was returned to Parliament for Caithness, a seat he held until 1918, and then represented Caithness and Sutherland between 1918 and 1922. In 1918 he was created a Baronet, of Moray Lodge in the Royal Borough of Kensington.

Harmsworth was an active member of the Sylvan Debating Club, which was founded by his father, and served as its Secretary.

Family
Harmsworth married Annie Louisa, daughter of Thomas Scott, in 1892. They had four sons and three daughters. He died in January 1937, aged 66, and was succeeded in the baronetcy by his eldest son, Alfred. Lady Harmsworth died in December 1963.

References

External links
 
 

1870 births
1937 deaths
UK MPs 1900–1906
UK MPs 1906–1910
UK MPs 1910
UK MPs 1910–1918
UK MPs 1918–1922
Baronets in the Baronetage of the United Kingdom
People educated at St Marylebone Grammar School
Burials at East Finchley Cemetery
Leicester
Members of the Parliament of the United Kingdom for Highland constituencies
Scottish Liberal Party MPs